St Mary's Abbey, Oulton is a suppressed Benedictine monastery located in the village of Oulton near Stone in  Staffordshire, England.  The Abbey church is Grade II* listed, and other buildings are Grade II.

History

The community was founded in 1624 at Ghent, from a motherhouse established in Brussels in 1598 by Lady Mary Percy. In 1794 as a result of the French Revolution they were forced to flee to England, settling initially at Preston, moving in 1811 to Caverswall Castle, Stoke on Trent.

Oulton House was built in 1720 by solicitor Thomas Dent, and gradually extended. It was purchased by brewer John Joule in 1832. By the 1850s it was in use as a private asylum. In 1853 the sisters purchased Oulton House, They then commissioned Edward Welby Pugin to remodel the house and build a church. A chapter house, presbytery and sacristy were added in 1892. In 1925 a chapel to St Benedict was built between the chapter house and the sanctuary, on the south side.

The sisters operated a small boarding school at the Abbey until 1969, after which the school building was converted into a retreat centre for up to twenty-four retreatants: this continued until 1989 when the building was converted again, this time for nursing care.

Three Oulton nuns transferred to Kylemore Abbey in Ireland in 1992. And in 2002 the Benedictine community from Fernham Priory, Oxfordshire closed their house and many members moved into Oulton Abbey.

Community governance

The Abbey community was under the charge of an Abbess elected by the members and holds the position for life. Since 1624 twenty-two Lady Abbesses have held the post; those in recent history are listed below:

Dame Juliana Forster (1837–1869)Brought the community to Oulton and oversaw the building of the church
Dame Mary Catherine Beech (1869–1899)Oversaw the extensions and remodelling of Oulton House
Dame Laurentia Ward (1900–1921)The daughter of William George Ward
Dame Gertrude Beech (1921–1944)Extended the church with the new chapel
Dame Mary Agnes Spray (1944–1988)Oversaw the closure of the school and the opening of the retreat house
Dame Mary Benedicta Scott (1988–2019)Oversaw the opening of the nursing home and the closure of the Abbey

The Abbey today

A new nursing home was built for the Abbey in 2017. A nursery school is also operated within the grounds. By 2019, with just three nuns remaining in the community, the decision was taken to suppress the Abbey, with the remaining nuns joining Stanbrook Abbey in North Yorkshire, although the last abbess Dame Benedicta Scott remains at Oulton as a resident of the nursing home; a priest also remains in residence and the chapel continues as a public Mass Centre.

The property subsequently underwent substantial refurbishment and is occupied by the Oulton Abbey Care Home.

See also
Listed buildings in Stone Rural

References

Monasteries in Staffordshire
Benedictine monasteries in England